Andre Reynolds II (born May 2, 2001) is an American professional soccer player who plays as a full-back.

Club career

Chicago Fire
Born in Chicago, Illinois, Reynolds joined the academy side of local club Chicago Fire in 2015. On January 25, 2019, Reynolds signed a homegrown player deal with the Fire, joining the club's first team in Major League Soccer. With his signing, Reynolds became only the first academy player from the city of Chicago and the second-youngest academy signing for the club. Prior to signing with the Chicago Fire, Reynolds had already committed to playing college soccer with the Brown Bears.

On July 23, 2019, Reynolds made his professional debut for the Chicago Fire against Cruz Azul in the Leagues Cup. He started and played 58 minutes as the Fire were defeated 2–0. He then made his Major League Soccer debut on September 27, 2020, against Atlanta United, coming on as a second half stoppage-time substitute in a 2–0 victory.

Following the 2022 season, Reynolds was released by Chicago.

Memphis 901 (loan) 
On May 14, 2021, it was announced that Reynolds had joined USL Championship side Memphis 901 on loan for the 2021 season. He made his debut for the club on May 23, 2021, as a starter in a 2–2 draw against Atlanta United 2.

Career statistics

References

External links
 Profile at Chicago Fire

2001 births
Living people
American soccer players
Association football defenders
Chicago Fire FC players
Memphis 901 FC players
Major League Soccer players
USL Championship players
Soccer players from Chicago
Homegrown Players (MLS)
MLS Next Pro players
Chicago Fire FC II players